Hamdan District is a district of the Sana'a Governorate, Yemen. , the district had a population of 85,370 inhabitants. It is named after the ancient Yemeni tribe of Hamdan.

Populated places (incomplete list)
Al-Munaqqab
Hajar Saʽid
Haz
Jirban
Khalaqah
Luluwah
Madam
Suq Bayt Naʽam
Rayʽan

References

Districts of Sanaa Governorate
Hamdan District